The 1995 All-Ireland Under-21 Football Championship was the 32nd staging of the All-Ireland Under-21 Football Championship since its establishment by the Gaelic Athletic Association in 1964.

Cork entered the championship as defending champions, however, they were defeated by Tipperary in the Munster quarter-final.

On 10 September 1995, Kerry won the championship following a 3-10 to 1-12 defeat of Mayo in a replay of the All-Ireland final. This was their seventh All-Ireland title overall and their first in five championship seasons.

Results

All-Ireland Under-21 Football Championship

Semi-finals

Finals

References

1995
All-Ireland Under-21 Football Championship